Cereatta is a harvestman genus in the family Assamiidae.

Species
 Cereatta celeripes (Loman, 1910) - Cameroon
 Cereatta elegans Roewer, 1935 - Cameroon
 Cereatta kivuensis Roewer, 1961

See also
 List of Assamiidae species

References

 Cereatta on www.biologie.uni-ulm.de
 Assamiidae on Joel Hallan's Biology Catalog

External links

Harvestmen
Fauna of Cameroon